Welcome Home is a 2006 Spanish comedy-drama film written and directed by David Trueba, starring Pilar López de Ayala and Alejo Sauras as Eva and Samuel, a couple just settled in Madrid, alongside Ariadna Gil, Juan Echanove, Jorge Sanz, Javivi Gil Valle, Julián Villagrán, Juana Acosta, Vicente Haro, Carlos Larrañaga and Concha Velasco.

Cast

Production 
The film is a Fernando Trueba PC and Ensueño Films production, and it had the participation of Antena 3 and Canal+. Javier Limón and Andrés Calamaro were responsible for composing and producing the score. It was shot in between Madrid, Almería and Santander.

Release 
The film screened out as the opening film of the 9th Málaga Film Festival in March 2006. It was theatrically released in Spain on 7 April 2006.

Accolades 

|-
| align = "center" | 2006 || 9th Málaga Film Festival || Silver Biznaga for Best Director || David Trueba ||  || align= "center" | 
|-
| align = "center" | 2007 || 21st Goya Awards || Best Original Song || "Duermen los niños" by Andrés Calamaro, Javier Limón, David Trueba ||  || align = "center" | 
|}

See also 
 List of Spanish films of 2006

References 

2006 films
2006 romantic comedy-drama films
2000s Spanish-language films
Spanish romantic comedy-drama films
Films set in Madrid
Films shot in Almería
Films shot in Madrid
Films shot in Cantabria
Atresmedia Cine films
2000s Spanish films